Eleotridae is a family of fish commonly known as sleeper gobies, with about 34 genera and 180 species. Most species are found in the tropical Indo-Pacific region, but there are also species in subtropical and temperate regions, warmer parts of the Americas and near the Atlantic coast in Africa. While many eleotrids pass through a planktonic stage in the sea and some spend their entire lives in the sea; as adults, the majority live in freshwater streams and brackish water. One of its genera, Caecieleotris, is troglobitic. They are especially important as predators in the freshwater stream ecosystems on oceanic islands such as New Zealand and Hawaii that otherwise lack the predatory fish families typical of nearby continents, such as catfish. Anatomically, they are similar to the gobies (Gobiidae), though unlike the majority of gobies, they do not have a pelvic sucker.

Like the true gobies, they are generally small fish that live on the substrate, often amongst vegetation, in burrows, or in crevices within rocks and coral reefs. Although goby-like in many ways, sleeper gobies lack the pelvic fin sucker and that, together with other morphological differences, is used to distinguish the two families. The Gobiidae and Eleotridae likely share a common ancestor and they are both placed in the order Gobiiformes, along with a few other small families containing goby-like fishes.

Dormitator and Eleotris, two of the most widespread and typical genera, include a variety of species that inhabit marine, estuarine and freshwater habitats. A few of these, such as the empire gudgeon (H. compressa) and peacock gudgeon (Tateurndina ocellicauda), are sometimes kept in aquariums.

Taxonomy

The family has been divided into three subfamilies: Butinae, Eleotrinae and Milyeringinae. However, because of the deep divergence between the three, some authorities have recommended splitting them into separate families: Butidae, Eleotridae and Milyeringidae. The 5th edition of Fishes of the World follows this classification and this means that the following genera are currently included within the Eleotridae. However, the family Xenisthmidae is regarded as a synonym of the Eleotridae, according to the 5th Edition of Fishes of the World.

 Allomicrodesmus Schultz, 1966
 Allomogurnda Allen, 2003
 Belobranchus Bleeker, 1857
 Bunaka Herre, 1927
 Caecieleotris Walsh & Chakrabarty, 2016
 Calumia Smith, 1958
 Dormitator Gill, 1861
 Eleotris Bloch & Schneider, 1801
 Erotelis Poey, 1860
 Giuris Sauvage, 1880
 Gobiomorphus Gill, 1863
 Gobiomorus Lacépède, 1800
 Guavina Bleeker, 1874
 Gymnoxenisthmus Gill, Bogorodsky & Mal, 2014 
 Hemieleotris Meek & Hildebrand, 1916
 Hypseleotris Gill, 1863
 Kimberleyeleotris Hoese & Allen, 1987
 Leptophilypnion Roberts, 2013
 Leptophilypnus Meek & Hildebrand, 1916
 Microphilypnus Myers, 1927
 Mogurnda Gill, 1863
 Paraxenisthmus Gill & Hoese, 1993
 Philypnodon Bleeker, 1874
 Ratsirakia Maugé, 1984
 Rotuma Springer, 1988
 Tateurndina Nichols, 1955
 Tyson Springer, 1983
 Xenisthmus Snyder, 1908

References

 
Gobiiformes
Taxa named by Charles Lucien Bonaparte